Musée Tomo is a museum for contemporary Japanese ceramic art, located at 4-1-35 Toranomon, Minato, Tokyo, Japan, featuring the collection of Tomo Kikuchi.

References 

 Musée Tomo website (English)
 e-Yakimono article
 Lonely Planet description
 Where In Tokyo description

Art museums and galleries in Tokyo
Ceramics museums in Japan
Buildings and structures in Minato, Tokyo